The NSW League Two Men is an Australian semi-professional association football league comprising teams from New South Wales. The league sits at Level 3 on the New South Wales league system (Level 4 of the overall Australian league system). The competition is administered by Football NSW, the governing body of the sport in the southern region of the state (the northern region governed by Northern NSW Football). At the conclusion of the 2015 season it was announced that the State League 1 would become the NPL3 and in 2022 seasons onwards, the league name change again from "National Premier League 3 NSW" to "Football NSW League Two".

Format
The regular season normally consists of 26 rounds with each team playing each other twice-home and away. Following the regular season the top five teams on the table play in a finals series.

Competing clubs 2023
The following clubs participated in the NSW League Two during the 2023 season..

Seasons

Source: www.socceraust.co.uk

References

External links
 Football NSW League Two Website

3
Fourth level football leagues in Asia